Lanell Tyrone Culver (born July 6, 1983) is a former American football safety. He was drafted by the Green Bay Packers in the sixth round of the 2006 NFL Draft. He played college football at Fresno State.

Early years
Culver attended Palmdale High School in Palmdale, California and won All-League and All-CIF honors.

External links
Fresno State Bulldogs bio
Miami Dolphins bio

1983 births
Living people
People from Palmdale, California
American football safeties
Fresno State Bulldogs football players
Green Bay Packers players
Miami Dolphins players
Players of American football from California
Sportspeople from Los Angeles County, California
People from Lancaster, California